Aaron Conway (born 29 March 1985) was a Scottish professional footballer who plays for Lochee Harp. He also previously played for Dundee United, Clyde (on loan) Dundee, Forfar Athletic, Carnoustie Panmure, East Fife, Livingston where he won the league 1 championship  and Peterhead.

Playing career
Born in Dundee, Conway started his career with hometown club Dundee United but made just two substitute appearances for the Terrors, appearing in games late in each of the 2002–03 and 2003–04 seasons. Conway played ten games during a loan spell with Clyde, scoring his first senior goal, before being released from Tannadice in January 2005. Upon his release, Conway moved to city rivals Dundee, managing the same number of appearances, before signing for Forfar Athletic in July 2005.

Conway left senior football in 2006, joining Carnoustie Panmure. He then joined East Fife, managed by former Dundee United colleague Stevie Crawford, in July 2009. In June 2010, he signed a one-year contract with newly promoted Second Division side Livingston where he won the league .

In June 2011, Conway left Livingston to join Peterhead. After leaving Peterhead in 2013, Conway signed for Highland Football League side Buckie Thistle. He left Buckie in June 2014, deciding to retire from football aged 29 due to his work commitments offshore.

Following a spell away from the game, Conway signed for Lochee Harp and added coaching responsibilities to his role in 2022.

References

External links
 

1985 births
Association football wingers
Buckie Thistle F.C. players
Carnoustie Panmure F.C. players
Clyde F.C. players
Dundee F.C. players
Dundee United F.C. players
East Fife F.C. players
Forfar Athletic F.C. players
Living people
Livingston F.C. players
Peterhead F.C. players
Lochee Harp F.C. players
Scottish Football League players
Scottish footballers
Scottish Premier League players
Footballers from Dundee
Highland Football League players